Aluf Benn (born 1965) is an Israeli journalist, author and editor-in-chief of the liberal Israeli national daily Haaretz.

Biography
Aluf Bomstein (later Benn) was born in Ramat HaSharon, son of Atida and 2010 Israel Prize poet laureate Aryeh Bomstein (who publishes under Aryeh Sivan). He was named for his uncle, Aluf Horowitz, who was killed in action in the Gaza Strip during the Israeli retribution operations of 1955.

Benn holds an MBA degree from the Kellogg School of Management at Northwestern University, and a degree from Tel Aviv University.

Media career
He began working for the paper Ha'ir in 1986, and Hebraicized his surname Bomstein to Benn. In 1989, he moved to the newspaper Haaretz, where he served in various roles, including night editor, investigative reporter, head of the news division and wrote on security matters. His articles have been published in a variety of international newspapers, including The New York Times, The Guardian, Foreign Affairs and Newsweek.

On August 1, 2011, he was appointed editor-in-chief of Haaretz.

References

External links
Column archive at Business Insider
Column archive at Foreign Affairs
Column archive at The Guardian
Column archive at Haaretz
Column archive at The National Interest
Column archive at Salon.com

Aluf Benn at Journalisted

The Politics of Benjamin Netanyahu: An interview with Aluf Benn - Fathom Journal

Living people
Israeli Jews
Israeli journalists
Israeli columnists
Haaretz people
Kellogg School of Management alumni
Tel Aviv University alumni
People from Ramat HaSharon
Israeli newspaper editors
Year of birth missing (living people)